"When I Look into Your Eyes" is the sixth single released by American rock band FireHouse. The song, a power ballad, became the band's second hit ballad, reaching No. 8 on the Billboard Hot 100 for the week ending October 17, 1992. The song peaked at number 65 on the UK Singles Chart for the week ending December 19, 1992.

The song was written by guitarist Bill Leverty and vocalist C.J. Snare.

Critical reception
Larry Flick, Billboard's reviewer, left warm review on this track. He thought that despite "a bit purple in the prose department... this cut might tug the heartstrings of top 40 listeners".

Charts

Year-end chart

References

External links
Music Video for "When I Look Into Your Eyes"

1992 songs
1992 singles
FireHouse (band) songs
Epic Records singles
Black-and-white music videos
Songs written by C. J. Snare
Songs written by Bill Leverty
Glam metal ballads